Saqvaqjuac was a 465 m2 Arctic research camp located on the north side of Chesterfield Inlet, Kivalliq Region, Nunavut, Canada, 35 km north-northwest of the hamlet of Chesterfield Inlet. It was opened in 1977, operated every year until 1982, and last used in 1988. Research subjects included whole-lake methane addition, phosphorus and nitrogen eutrophication experiments, and long-range atmospheric transport. The project was operated by the Freshwater Institute, part of Fisheries and Oceans Canada.

References

History of Nunavut